The "Five Black Categories" referred to the following five political identities. These groups were:

 Landlords
 Rich farmers
 Counter-revolutionaries
 Bad influencers ["bad elements"]
 Right-wingers

During the period of the Chinese Cultural Revolution (1966–1976) in the People's Republic of China, Mao Zedong ordained that people in these groups should be considered enemies of the Revolution. Conversely, Mao categorized groups of people, such as members of the Chinese Communist Party, poor farmers and low class workers, as Five Red Categories. This new Red/Black class distinction was used to create a status society.

Cultural Revolution 

Starting from the "Red August" of 1966, people in the Five Black Categories were separated out for struggle sessions, humiliation, re-education, beating, and persecution. Many of them were killed by the Red Guards and others. Mao believed that victimizing these people, as well as other groups of citizens – such as teachers, educated intellectuals, and enemies of the Communist Party (cadres) – was a necessary component to initiate the changes in the Chinese culture that he desired. He believed that those who were victimized either deserved it or became better citizens as a result of it. In general, intellectuals were called the "Stinking Old Ninth". Effectively, within a few years, the education and medical infrastructure of China was completely destroyed. 

According to a speech by Jiang Qing, who was his wife and Party's senior leader, "If good people beat bad people, it serves them right; if bad people beat good people, the good people achieve glory; if good people beat good people, it is a misunderstanding; without beatings, you do not get acquainted and then no longer need to beat them" (Walder 149).

Members of the Black Classes were systematically discriminated against, as one's classification could affect employment opportunities and career prospects and even marriage opportunities. This could also be passed onto their children. Over time this resulted in a victimized underclass that was treated as if it were still composed of powerful and dominant people.

See also
Stinking Old Ninth
Five Red Categories
Four Olds
Red Terror

References

Further reading 
MacFarquhar, Roderick, John K. Fairbank, and Denis C. Twitchett, eds.  "Mass Mobilization." The Cambridge History of China, Volume 15, The People's Republic Part 2. Revolutions within the Chinese Revolution, 1966–1982.  545.  New York: Cambridge University Press, 1991. Print.
WALDER, Andrew G. Fractured Rebellions: The Beijing Red Guard Movement. Cambridge: Harvard University Press, 2009. Print.
Yongyi, Song. "Chronology of Mass Killings during the Chinese Cultural Revolution (1966-1976)." Online Encyclopedia of Mass Violence.  25 August 2011. Web. 31 March 2014.

Cultural Revolution
Ideology of the Chinese Communist Party
Politics of China
Political repression
Persecution of intellectuals